The Norwegian Union of Gold Workers (NGAF) was a trade union representing goldsmiths in Norway.

The union was founded on 31 May 1909, and affiliated to the Norwegian Confederation of Trade Unions.  By 1924, it had only 435 members, but by 1963, this had grown to 1,033.  By the 1980s, its membership had declined, so on 1 January 1985, it merged into the Norwegian Union of Iron and Metalworkers.

Presidents
1935: Nils Heggland
1948: Hugo Lindahl
1967: Kåre Dahlberg

References

Metal trade unions
Defunct trade unions of Norway
Norwegian Confederation of Trade Unions
Trade unions established in 1909
Trade unions disestablished in 1985
1909 establishments in Norway